Memorial Day (originally known as Decoration Day) is a federal holiday in the United States for mourning the U.S. military personnel who have died while serving in the United States armed forces. It is observed on the last Monday of May. From 1868 to 1970 it was observed on May 30.

Many people visit cemeteries and memorials on Memorial Day to honor and mourn those who died while serving in the U.S. military. Many volunteers place American flags on the graves of military personnel in national cemeteries. Memorial Day is also considered the unofficial beginning of summer in the United States.

The first national observance of Memorial Day occurred on May 30, 1868. Then known as Decoration Day, the holiday was proclaimed by Commander in Chief John A. Logan of the Grand Army of the Republic to honor the Union soldiers who had died in the Civil War. This national observance was preceded by many local ones between the end of the Civil War and Logan's declaration. Many cities and people have claimed to be the first to observe it. However, in 2022, the National Cemetery Administration, a division of the Department of Veterans Affairs, credited Mary Ann Williams with originating the "idea of strewing the graves of Civil War soldiers - Union and Confederate" with flowers.

Official recognition as a holiday spread among the states, beginning with New York in 1873. By 1890, every Union state had adopted it. The World Wars turned it into a day of remembrance for all members of the U.S. military who fought and died in service. In 1971, Congress standardized the holiday as "Memorial Day" and changed its observance to the last Monday in May.

Two other days celebrate those who have served or are serving in the U.S. military: Armed Forces Day (which is earlier in May), an unofficial U.S. holiday for honoring those currently serving in the armed forces, and Veterans Day (on November 11), which honors all those who have served in the United States Armed Forces.

Claimed origins 

A variety of cities and people have claimed origination of Memorial Day. In some such cases, the claims relate to documented events, occurring before or after the Civil War. Others may stem from general traditions of decorating soldiers' graves with flowers, rather than specific events leading to the national proclamation. Soldiers' graves were decorated in the U.S. before and during the American Civil War. Other claims may be less respectable, appearing to some researchers as taking credit without evidence, while erasing better-evidenced events or connections.

Precedents in the South

Charleston, South Carolina 
Of documented commemorations occurring after the end of the Civil War and with the same purpose as Logan's proclamation, the earliest occurred in Charleston, South Carolina. On May 1, 1865, formerly enslaved Black adults and children held a parade of 10,000 people to honor 257 dead Union soldiers. Those soldiers had been buried in a mass grave at the Washington Race Course, having died at the Confederate prison camp located there. After the city fell, recently freed persons unearthed and properly buried the soldiers. Then, on May 1, they held a parade and placed flowers. The estimate of 10,000 people comes from contemporaneous reporting, more recently unearthed by Historian David W. Blight, following references in archived material from Union veterans where the events were also described. Blight cites articles in the Charleston Daily Courier and the New-York Tribune.

No direct link has been established between this event and Logan's 1868 proclamations. Although Blight has claimed that "African Americans invented Memorial Day in Charleston, South Carolina", in 2012, he stated that he "has no evidence" that the event in Charleston effectively led to General Logan's call for the national holiday.

Virginia 
On June 3, 1861, Warrenton, Virginia, was the location of the first Civil War soldier's grave ever to be decorated, according to a Richmond Times-Dispatch newspaper article in 1906. This decoration was for the funeral of the first soldier killed in action during the Civil War, John Quincy Marr, who fought and died on June 1, 1861, during a skirmish at Battle of Fairfax Courthouse in Virginia.

Jackson, Mississippi 
On April 26, 1865, in Jackson, Mississippi, Sue Landon Vaughan supposedly decorated the graves of Confederate and Union soldiers. However, the earliest recorded reference to this event did not appear until many years after. Regardless, mention of the observance is inscribed on the southeast panel of the Confederate Monument in Jackson, erected in 1891.

Columbus, Georgia 
The United States National Park Service and numerous scholars attribute the beginning of a Memorial Day practice in the South to a group of women of Columbus, Georgia. The women were the Ladies Memorial Association of Columbus. They were represented by Mary Ann Williams (Mrs. Charles J. Williams) who, as Secretary, wrote a letter to press in March 1866 asking their assistance in establishing annual holiday to decorate the graves of soldiers throughout the south.  The letter was reprinted in several southern states and the plans were noted in newspapers in the north. The date of April 26 was chosen. The holiday was observed in Atlanta, Augusta, Macon, Columbus and elsewhere in Georgia as well as Montgomery, Alabama; Memphis, Tennessee; Louisville, Kentucky; New Orleans, Louisiana; Jackson, Mississippi, and across the south.  In some cities, mostly in Virginia, other dates in May and June were observed. General John A. Logan commented on the observances in a speech to veterans on July 4, 1866, in Salem, Illinois. After General Logan's General Order No. 11 to the Grand Army of the Republic to observe May 30, 1868, the earlier version of the holiday began to be referred to as Confederate Memorial Day.

Columbus, Mississippi 
A year after the war's end, in April 1866, four women of Columbus gathered together at Friendship Cemetery to decorate the graves of the Confederate soldiers. They also felt moved to honor the Union soldiers buried there, and to note the grief of their families, by decorating their graves as well. The story of their gesture of humanity and reconciliation is held by some writers as the inspiration of the original Memorial Day despite its occurring last among the claimed inspirations.

Other Southern Precedents 
According to the United States Library of Congress website, "Southern women decorated the graves of soldiers even before the Civil War’s end. Records show that by 1865, Mississippi, Virginia, and South Carolina all had precedents for Memorial Day." The earliest Southern Memorial Day celebrations were simple, somber occasions for veterans and their families to honor the dead and tend to local cemeteries. In following years, the Ladies' Memorial Association and other groups increasingly focused rituals on preserving Confederate culture and the Lost Cause of the Confederacy narrative.

Precedents in the North

Gettysburg, Pennsylvania 
The 1863 cemetery dedication at Gettysburg, Pennsylvania, included a ceremony of commemoration at the graves of dead soldiers. Some have therefore claimed that President Abraham Lincoln was the founder of Memorial Day. However, Chicago journalist Lloyd Lewis tried to make the case that it was Lincoln's funeral that spurred the soldiers' grave decorating that followed.

Boalsburg, Pennsylvania 
On July 4, 1864, ladies decorated soldiers' graves according to local historians in Boalsburg, Pennsylvania. Boalsburg promotes itself as the birthplace of Memorial Day. However, no published reference to this event has been found earlier than the printing of the History of the 148th Pennsylvania Volunteers in 1904. In a footnote to a story about her brother, Mrs. Sophie (Keller) Hall described how she and Emma Hunter decorated the grave of Emma's father, Reuben Hunter, and then the graves of all soldiers in the cemetery. The original story did not account for Reuben Hunter's death occurring two months later on September 19, 1864. It also did not mention Mrs. Elizabeth Myers as one of the original participants. However, a bronze statue of all three women gazing upon Reuben Hunter's grave now stands near the entrance to the Boalsburg Cemetery. Although July 4, 1864, was a Monday, the town now claims that the original decoration was on one of the Sundays in October 1864.

National Decoration Day 

On May 5, 1868, General John A. Logan issued a proclamation calling for "Decoration Day" to be observed annually and nationwide; he was commander-in-chief of the Grand Army of the Republic (GAR), an organization of and for Union Civil War veterans founded in Decatur, Illinois. With his proclamation, Logan adopted the Memorial Day practice that had begun in the Southern states three years earlier. The northern states quickly adopted the holiday. In 1868, memorial events were held in 183 cemeteries in 27 states, and 336 in 1869. One author claims that the date was chosen because it was not the anniversary of any particular battle. According to a White House address in 2010, the date was chosen as the optimal date for flowers to be in bloom in the North.

Michigan state holiday 

In 1871, Michigan made Decoration Day an official state holiday and by 1890, every northern state had followed suit. There was no standard program for the ceremonies, but they were typically sponsored by the Women's Relief Corps, the women's auxiliary of the Grand Army of the Republic (GAR), which had 100,000 members. By 1870, the remains of nearly 300,000 Union dead had been reinterred in 73 national cemeteries, located near major battlefields and thus mainly in the South. The most famous are Gettysburg National Cemetery in Pennsylvania and Arlington National Cemetery, near Washington, :D.C.

Waterloo, New York proclamation 
On May 26, 1966, President Lyndon B. Johnson designated an "official" birthplace of the holiday by signing the presidential proclamation naming Waterloo, New York, as the holder of the title. This action followed House Concurrent Resolution 587, in which the 89th Congress had officially recognized that the patriotic tradition of observing Memorial Day had begun one hundred years prior in Waterloo, New York. The village credits druggist Henry C. Welles and county clerk John B. Murray as the founders of the holiday. The legitimacy of this claim has been called into question by several scholars.

Early national history 
In April 1865, following Lincoln's assassination, commemorations were widespread. The more than 600,000 soldiers of both sides who fought and died in the Civil War meant that burial and memorialization took on new cultural significance. Under the leadership of women during the war, an increasingly formal practice of decorating graves had taken shape. In 1865, the federal government also began creating the United States National Cemetery System for the Union war dead.

By the 1880s, ceremonies were becoming more consistent across geography as the GAR provided handbooks that presented specific procedures, poems, and Bible verses for local post commanders to utilize in planning the local event. Historian Stuart McConnell reports:

on the day itself, the post assembled and marched to the local cemetery to decorate the graves of the fallen, an enterprise meticulously organized months in advance to assure that none were missed. Finally came a simple and subdued graveyard service involving prayers, short patriotic speeches, and music … and at the end perhaps a rifle salute.

Relationship to Confederate Memorial Day 

In 1868, some Southern public figures began adding the label "Confederate" to their commemorations and claimed that Northerners had appropriated the holiday. The first official celebration of Confederate Memorial Day as a public holiday occurred in 1874, following a proclamation by the Georgia legislature. By 1916, ten states celebrated it, on June 3, the birthday of CSA President Jefferson Davis. Other states chose late April dates, or May 10, commemorating Davis' capture.

The Ladies' Memorial Association played a key role in using Memorial Day rituals to preserve Confederate culture. Various dates ranging from April 25 to mid-June were adopted in different Southern states. Across the South, associations were founded, many by women, to establish and care for permanent cemeteries for the Confederate dead, organize commemorative ceremonies, and sponsor appropriate monuments as a permanent way of remembering the Confederate dead. The most important of these was the United Daughters of the Confederacy, which grew frerate South. Changes in the ceremony's hymns and speeches reflect an evolution of the ritual into a symbol of cultural renewal and conservatism in the South. By 1913, David Blight argues, the theme of American nationalism shared equal time with the Confederate.

Renaming
By the 20th century, various Union memorial traditions, celebrated on different days, merged, and Memorial Day eventually extended to honor all Americans who fought and died while in the U.S. military service. Indiana from the 1860s to the 1920s saw numerous debates on how to expand the celebration. It was a favorite lobbying activity of the Grand Army of the Republic (GAR). An 1884 GAR handbook explained that Memorial Day was "the day of all days in the G.A.R. Calendar" in terms of mobilizing public support for pensions. It advised family members to "exercise great care" in keeping the veterans sober.

Memorial Day speeches became an occasion for veterans, politicians, and ministers to commemorate the Civil War and, at first, to rehash the "atrocities" of the enemy. They mixed religion and celebratory nationalism for the people to make sense of their history in terms of sacrifice for a better nation. People of all religious beliefs joined and the point was often made that German and Irish soldiers – ethnic minorities which faced discrimination in the United States – had become true Americans in the "baptism of blood" on the battlefield.

In the national capital in 1913 the four-day "Blue-Gray Reunion" featured parades, re-enactments, and speeches from a host of dignitaries, including President Woodrow Wilson, the first Southerner elected to the White House since the War. James Heflin of Alabama gave the main address. Heflin was a noted orator; his choice as Memorial Day speaker was criticized, as he was opposed for his support of segregation; however, his speech was moderate in tone and stressed national unity and goodwill, gaining him praise from newspapers.

The name "Memorial Day", which was first attested in 1882, gradually became more common than "Decoration Day" after World War II but was not declared the official name by federal law until 1967. On June 28, 1968, Congress passed the Uniform Monday Holiday Act, which moved four holidays, including Memorial Day, from their traditional dates to a specified Monday in order to create a convenient three-day weekend. The change moved Memorial Day from its traditional May 30 date to the last Monday in May. The law took effect at the federal level in 1971. After some initial confusion and unwillingness to comply, all 50 states adopted Congress's change of date within a few years.

By the early 20th century, the GAR complained more and more about the younger generation. In 1913, one Indiana veteran complained that younger people born since the war had a "tendency ... to forget the purpose of Memorial Day and make it a day for games, races, and revelry, instead of a day of memory and tears". Indeed, in 1911 the scheduling of the Indianapolis Motor Speedway car race (later named the Indianapolis 500) was vehemently opposed by the increasingly elderly GAR. The state legislature in 1923 rejected holding the race on the holiday. But the new American Legion and local officials wanted the big race to continue, so Governor Warren McCray vetoed the bill and the race went on.

Civil religious holiday

Memorial Day endures as a holiday which most businesses observe because it marks the unofficial beginning of summer. The Veterans of Foreign Wars (VFW) and Sons of Union Veterans of the Civil War (SUVCW) advocated returning to the original date. The VFW stated in 2002:

Changing the date merely to create three-day weekends has undermined the very meaning of the day. No doubt, this has contributed a lot to the general public's nonchalant observance of Memorial Day.

In 2000, Congress passed the National Moment of Remembrance Act, asking people to stop and remember at 3:00 pm.

On Memorial Day, the flag of the United States is raised briskly to the top of the staff and then solemnly lowered to the half-staff position, where it remains only until noon. It is then raised to full-staff for the remainder of the day.

The National Memorial Day Concert takes place on the west lawn of the United States Capitol. The concert is broadcast on PBS and NPR. Music is performed, and respect is paid to the people who gave their lives for their country.

Across the United States, the central event is attending one of the thousands of parades held on Memorial Day in large and small cities. Most of these feature marching bands and an overall military theme with the Active Duty, Reserve, National Guard, and Veteran service members participating along with military vehicles from various wars.

Scholars, following the lead of sociologist Robert Bellah, often make the argument that the United States has a secular "civil religion" – one with no association with any religious denomination or viewpoint – that has incorporated Memorial Day as a sacred event. With the Civil War, a new theme of death, sacrifice, and rebirth enters the civil religion. Memorial Day gave ritual expression to these themes, integrating the local community into a sense of nationalism. The American civil religion, in contrast to that of France, was never anticlerical or militantly secular; in contrast to Britain, it was not tied to a specific denomination, such as the Church of England. The Americans borrowed from different religious traditions so that the average American saw no conflict between the two, and deep levels of personal motivation were aligned with attaining national goals.

Longest observance 
Since 1868, Doylestown, Pennsylvania, has held an annual Memorial Day parade which it claims to be the nation's oldest continuously running. Grafton, West Virginia, has also had an ongoing parade since 1868. However, the Memorial Day parade in Rochester, Wisconsin, predates both the Doylestown and the Grafton parades by one year (1867).

Poppies 

In 1915, following the Second Battle of Ypres, Lieutenant Colonel John McCrae, a physician with the Canadian Expeditionary Force, wrote the poem, "In Flanders Fields". Its opening lines refer to the fields of poppies that grew among the soldiers' graves in Flanders.

In 1918, inspired by the poem, YWCA worker Moina Michael attended a YWCA Overseas War Secretaries' conference wearing a silk poppy pinned to her coat and distributed over two dozen more to others present. In 1920, the National American Legion adopted it as its official symbol of remembrance.

Observance dates (1971–2037)

Related traditions

Decoration Day (Appalachia and Liberia) 

Decoration Days in Southern Appalachia and Liberia are a tradition which arose by the 19th century. Decoration practices are localized and unique to individual families, cemeteries, and communities, but common elements that unify the various Decoration Day practices are thought to represent syncretism of predominantly Christian cultures in 19th century Southern Appalachia with pre-Christian influences from Scotland, Ireland, and African cultures. Appalachian and Liberian cemetery decoration traditions are thought to have more in common with one another than with United States Memorial Day traditions which are focused on honoring the military dead. Appalachian and Liberian cemetery decoration traditions pre-date the United States Memorial Day holiday.

In the United States, cemetery decoration practices have been recorded in the Appalachian regions of West Virginia, Virginia, Kentucky, Tennessee, northern South Carolina, northern Georgia, northern and central Alabama, and northern Mississippi. Appalachian cemetery decoration has also been observed in areas outside Appalachia along routes of westward migration from that region: northern Louisiana, northeastern Texas, Arkansas, eastern Oklahoma, and southern Missouri.

According to scholars Alan and Karen Jabbour, "the geographic spread ... from the Smokies to northeastern Texas and Liberia, offer strong evidence that the southern Decoration Day originated well back in the nineteenth century. The presence of the same cultural tradition throughout the Upland South argues for the age of the tradition, which was carried westward (and eastward to Africa) by nineteenth-century migration and has survived in essentially the same form till the present."

While these customs may have inspired in part rituals to honor military dead like Memorial Day, numerous differences exist between Decoration Day customs and Memorial Day, including that the date is set differently by each family or church for each cemetery to coordinate the maintenance, social, and spiritual aspects of decoration.

In film, literature, and music

Films
 In Memorial Day, a 2012 war film starring James Cromwell, Jonathan Bennett, and John Cromwell, a character recalls and relives memories of World War II.

Music
 Charles Ives's symphonic 1912 poem Decoration Day depicts the holiday as he experienced it in his childhood, with his father's band leading the way to the town cemetery, the playing of "Taps" on a trumpet, and a livelier march tune on the way back to the town. It is frequently played with three other Ives works based on holidays, as the second movement of A Symphony: New England Holidays.
 American rock band Drive-By Truckers released a Jason Isbell–penned song titled "Decoration Day" on their 2003 album of the same title.

Poetry
Poems commemorating Memorial Day include:
 Francis M. Finch's "The Blue and the Gray" (1867)
 Michael Anania's "Memorial Day" (1994)
 Henry Wadsworth Longfellow's "Decoration Day" (1882)
 Joyce Kilmer's "Memorial Day"

See also

United States

 Remembrance Day at the Gettysburg Battlefield, an annual honoring of Civil War dead held near the anniversary of the Gettysburg Address
 A Great Jubilee Day, first held the last Monday in May 1783 (American Revolutionary War)
 Armed Forces Day, third Saturday in May, a more narrowly observed remembrance honoring those currently serving in the U.S. military
 Armistice Day, November 11, the original name of Veterans Day in the United States
 Confederate Memorial Day, observed on various dates in many states in the South in memory of those killed fighting for the Confederacy during the American Civil War
 Memorial Day massacre of 1937, May 30, held to remember demonstrators shot by police in Chicago
 Nora Fontaine Davidson, credited with the first Memorial Day ceremony in Petersburg, Virginia
 Patriot Day, September 11, in memory of people killed in the September 11, 2001 attacks
 United States military casualties of war
 Veterans Day, November 11, in memory of American military deaths during World War I. See Remembrance Day for similar observances in Canada, the United Kingdom, and other Commonwealth nations.

Other countries
 ANZAC Day, April 25, an analogous observance in Australia and New Zealand
 Armistice Day, November 11, the original name of Veterans Day in the United States and Remembrance Day in Canada, the United Kingdom, and other Commonwealth nations
 Heroes' Day, various dates in various countries recognizing national heroes
 International Day of United Nations Peacekeepers, May 29, international observance recognizing United Nations peacekeepers
 Remembrance Day, November 11, a similar observance in Canada, the United Kingdom, and many other Commonwealth nations originally marking the end of World War I
 Remembrance of the Dead ("Dodenherdenking"), May 4, a similar observance in the Netherlands
 Volkstrauertag ("People's Mourning Day"), a similar observance in Germany usually in November
 Yom Hazikaron (Israeli memorial day), the day before Independence Day (Israel), around Iyar 4
 Decoration Day (Canada), a Canadian holiday that recognizes veterans of Canada's military which has largely been eclipsed by the similar Remembrance Day
 Memorial Day (South Korea), June 6, the day to commemorate the men and women who died while in military service during the Korean War and other significant wars or battles
 Victoria Day, a Canadian holiday on the last Monday before May 25 each year, lacks the military memorial aspects of Memorial Day but serves a similar function as marking the start of cultural summer

References

Further reading

 Albanese, Catherine. "Requiem for Memorial Day: Dissent in the Redeemer Nation", American Quarterly, Vol. 26, No. 4 (Oct. 1974), pp. 386–398 in JSTOR
 Bellah, Robert N. "Civil Religion in America". Daedalus 1967 96(1): 1–21. online edition
 Bellware, Daniel, and Richard Gardiner, The Genesis of the Memorial Day Holiday in America (Columbus State University, 2014).
 Blight, David W.  "Decoration Day: The Origins of Memorial Day in North and South" in Alice Fahs and Joan Waugh, eds. The Memory of the Civil War in American Culture (2004), online edition pp. 94–129; the standard scholarly history
 Blight, David W.  Race and Reunion: The Civil War in American Memory (2000) ch. 3, "Decorations" excerpt and text search
 Buck, Paul H. The Road to Reunion, 1865–1900 (1937) 
 Cherry, Conrad. "Two American Sacred Ceremonies: Their Implications for the Study of Religion in America", American Quarterly, Vol. 21, No. 4 (Winter, 1969), pp. 739–754 in JSTOR
 Dennis, Matthew. Red, White, and Blue Letter Days: An American Calendar (2002) 
 Jabbour, Alan, and Karen Singer Jabbour. Decoration Day in the Mountains: Traditions of Cemetery Decoration in the Southern Appalachians (University of North Carolina Press; 2010) 
 Myers, Robert J. "Memorial Day". Chapter 24 in Celebrations: The Complete Book of American Holidays. (1972)

External links

 36 USC 116. Memorial Day (designation law)
 United States Department of Veterans Affairs

1868 establishments in the United States
Annual events in the United States
Federal holidays in the United States
Holidays and observances by scheduling (nth weekday of the month)
Holidays related to the American Civil War
May observances
Monday observances
Observances honoring victims of war
Public holidays in the United States
Recurring events established in 1868
Title 36 of the United States Code
United States flag flying days